The 2017 Prudential RideLondon–Surrey Classic was a road cycling one-day race that took place on 30 July in London, England. It was the sixth edition of the London–Surrey Classic and was the twenty-eighth event of the 2017 UCI World Tour. It was the race's first appearance on the World Tour calendar.

Teams
As a new event to the UCI World Tour, all UCI WorldTeams were invited to the race, but not obligated to compete in the race. As such, fourteen of the eighteen WorldTeams elected to compete. Eight UCI Professional Continental teams competed, and thus completed the 22-team peloton.

Result

References

External links

2017 UCI World Tour
2017 in British sport
July 2017 sports events in the United Kingdom
2017